The 2023 Men's FIH Hockey Junior World Cup will be the 13th edition of the Men's FIH Hockey Junior World Cup, the biennial men's under-21 field hockey world championship organized by the International Hockey Federation. It will be held in Kuala Lumpur, Malaysia from 5 to 16 December 2023.

Qualification
Alongside the hosts, Malaysia, the 15 other teams will qualify via the continental championships.

See also
2023 Men's FIH Hockey World Cup
2023 Women's FIH Hockey Junior World Cup

References

 
Hockey Junior World Cup
Junior World Cup
International field hockey competitions hosted by Malaysia
FIH Hockey Junior World Cup
FIH Hockey World Cup
2020s in Kuala Lumpur
Sports competitions in Kuala Lumpur
Junior World Cup
FIH Hockey Junior World Cup